Kinmel Hall is a large country mansion within Kimnel Park near the village of St. George, close to the coastal town of Abergele, in Conwy county borough, Wales. The hall, the third building on the site, was completed in the mid 19th century for the family of a Welsh mining magnate. In 1929, the property ceased being a private residence; it has since been used as a boys' school, health spa, girls' school, wartime hospital, conference centre and hotel (on two occasions).

Since 2001 Kimnel Hall has remained empty after plans by several owners to renovate the building were not undertaken. In 2015 the UK's Victorian Society put it in its top ten at-risk Victorian and Edwardian buildings. In 2021 a campaign started to save Kinmel Hall from dereliction. The hall is a Grade I listed building and its gardens and parkland are designated on the Cadw/ICOMOS Register of Parks and Gardens of Special Historic Interest in Wales.

History

Early hall

The original Kinmel Hall was owned by the Reverend Edward Hughes. In 1786 it passed to his son 1st Baron Dinorben (1767-1852). However, Baron Dinorben's own son and heir William Lewis Hughes, 2nd Baron Dinorben, was disabled. He died just eight months after inheriting Kinmel Hall and the 'Dinorben' title became extinct. As a consequence, the Kinmel Park estate passed to William Hughes' cousin, Hugh Robert Hughes.

Expansion and redevelopment

Hugh Robert Hughes was from the Hughes copper mining family. It was he who was responsible for the present Queen Anne Revival chateau style house, which is the third on the site. On inheriting the property, Hughes wasted no redeveloping hall and its parkland. In the 1850s, he had a Neo-palladian style stable block, which is attributed to William Burn, constructed next to the old hall.

The old hall was completely remodelled and expanded. The new palatial house, which was built between 1871 and 1874, was designed by William Eden Nesfield.  Materials for construction were bought from the nearby Lleweni Hall. The building is an example of a calendar house. It has 365 windows, 12 entrances, and 122 rooms. Kinmel Hall is a Grade I listed building. An ornate oak fireplace in the library was damaged during a break-in 2013.

The 1870s hall is considered to be one example of the myriad of new types of buildings that were arising during the Victorian era to fulfil increasingly specialised functions. For example, there was a room in the mansion that was only to be used for the ironing of newspapers, so that the ink would not come off on the reader's hands. The building also featured a number of advanced Victorian machines that were used to power both a lift and a water fountain. 

The adjoining Venetian Gardens were designed by his father, W. A. Nesfield. The gardens and park are listed at Grade II* on the Cadw/ICOMOS Register of Parks and Gardens of Special Historic Interest in Wales.  

At the same time the hall was being built, major landscaping was undertaken to build a new  approach to the hall called Coed y Drive to the north of Kinmel Park. One of its gateway lodges (Llwyni Lodge (Golden Lodge) designed by Nesfield is now a Grade 1 listed buildings. Several local roads were removed and relocated, while new straight ones were built for traffic between Abergele and Prestatyn.   

Kinmel Hall was privately owned by members of the Hughes, Lewis and Fetherstonhaugh and Gill families until it was sold as a leasehold in 1929. Heraldic shields displayed throughout the hall show the unions between these families.

Public ownership
After the hall was sold, it became a boys school for a short while before it was converted in the 1930s to a 'rheuma spa', a health centre for the treatment of people with rheumatism. The health spa was run by Florence Lindley, formerly headmistress of Lowther College, at the nearby Bodelwyddan Castle. The spa remained open until the outbreak of World War II, when the hall was taken over as a military hospital.

Post-war the hall became the Clarendon School for Girls. The independent school remained at Kinmel Hall until an extensive fire in 1975. The damage forced the school to close at the hall and move to Haynes Park in Bedfordshire. 

After businessman Eddie Vince restored the building, it was used as a Christian conference centre until the house was sold at auction in 2001 to a property company. However, the proposed redevelopment by Derbyshire Investments failed to materialise.

Dereliction and preservation

Despite selling the leasehold of Kinmel Hall in 1929, the freehold and the surrounding parkland remained in the possession of the Hughes, Lewis and Fetherstonhaugh family until 2001. It was bought shortly before auction by Acer Properties Ltd BVI with a successful bid of £1.45m. The company's declared intention was to develop the property into a hotel, but these plans never materialised and the hall was allowed to remain vacant.
Concerns about Kinmel Hall falling into ruin were identified by the Victorian Society, which said it was one of the top ten at-risk Victorian and Edwardian buildings in 2015.

In early 2021 a campaign group published articles in the media with the aim of shaming its owners into either explaining their intentions, fully restoring it or selling it on. They also attempted to put pressure on Conwy Council and the Welsh government into helping to preserve the building. Conwy Council placed an injunction to prevent “unauthorised” work on the site and explored further action. As a result, the hall was put up for sale in April 2021, with a guide price of £750,000.

The auction on 13 May 2021 was conducted by Allsop and was listed as LOT 73 for £750,000. There were only three bidders and the hall was sold for £950,000  According to the auctioneers, the buyer lives locally and intends to restore the hall.

It was later reported in the media the new owner was Chris Cryer who had purchased the Hall through his company Blue Water NW Ltd (UK Company No: 12416687) and had plans to establish a camping pod facility within the grounds. In October 2021, the local council told the owners to stop renting out camping pods in the grounds of the historic property because they had not applied for planning permission and the location in the Grade 1 listed Venetian Gardens was not in keeping with its listed status. In early 2022, the new owners submitted applications for planning permission to site the pods in a different location (Conway council application reference number 0/49367), however they withdrew the application following strong objections from residents within Kinmel Park and other campaign groups.

References

Further reading

 Gentry, Six Hundred Years of a Peculiarly English Class, Adam Nicolson, 2012,  - contains a chapter on the house and family
 Kinmel Characters, Elaine Boxhall,  - history of Kinmel Hall and its owners

External links

Abergele
Buildings and structures in Conwy County Borough
Grade I listed buildings in Conwy County Borough
Registered historic parks and gardens in Conwy County Borough
Country houses in Wales
Grade I listed houses in Wales
Houses completed in the 19th century